is a video game developer and publisher based in Japan. While Red Company as a public corporation dates back to the mid-1980s, the first title released under the Red Entertainment brand was Gungrave on July 17, 2002. The name "RED" comes from "Royal Emperor Dragon". In 2011, the company was acquired by Chinese game developer UltiZen Games Limited. In 2014, Red Entertainment was sold to Oizumi Corporation.

Partial game list

NEC

PC Engine 
 Gate of Thunder
 Lords of Thunder
 PC-Genjin (Bonk) series
 Galaxy Fraulein Yuna series
 Tengai Makyō (Far East of Eden) series

Nintendo

Super NES 
 Chou Mahou Tairiku WOZZ
 Kabuki Rocks
 The Twisted Tales of Spike McFang
 Tengai Makyou Zero

GameCube 
 Tengai Makyō II: Manjimaru (remake)

Wii
 Minon: Everyday Hero
 Sakura Wars: So Long, My Love

Nintendo DS
Dramatic Dungeon Sakura Wars: Kimi Aru ga Tame
Project Hacker
Tengai Makyō II: Manjimaru (REMAKE)
Tsunde Tsumi Kiss
Tsumiki: Block Drop Mania
Fossil Fighters
Nostalgia
Fossil Fighters: Champions
Kenka Bancho Otome- Girl Beats Boys

Sony

PlayStation
 Galaxy Fraulein Yuna 3: Final Edition
 Legend of Himiko
 Mitsumete Knight
 Thousand Arms

PlayStation 2
 Blood Will Tell
 Bujingai
 Gungrave
 Gungrave: Overdose (publisher)
 Kidō Shinsengumi: Moeyo Ken
 Code of the Samurai
 Trigun: The Planet Gunsmoke
 Tengai Makyō II: Manjimaru (REMAKE)
 Kita e: Diamond Dust + Kiss is Beginning
 Sakura Wars: So Long, My Love
 Sakura Taisen ~Atsuki Chishio ni~
 Scared Rider Xechs

PlayStation Portable
 Record of War: Mariage (Agarest Senki: Mariage)
 Tengai Makyou: Daiyon no Mokushiroku: The Apocalypse IV (remake)
 Jyusaengi Engetsu Sangokuden

PlayStation 3
 Record of Agarest War (Agarest Senki)
 Record of Agarest War Zero (Agarest Senki Zero)
 Record of Agarest War 2 (Agarest Senki 2)

PlayStation 4
 Gungrave: G.O.R.E. (publisher)

Microsoft

Xbox
N.U.D.E.@ Natural Ultimate Digital Experiment
G.A.N.D@  GREATER AREAL NATURAL DEVLOPMENT

Xbox 360
 Record of Agarest War (Agarest Senki: Re-appearance)
 Record of Agarest War Zero (Agarest Senki Zero: Dawn of War)
 Record of Agarest War (Agarest Senki:dawn hokuken )

Sega
 Sakura Wars (Sakura Taisen) series

Sega CD
 Lords of Thunder

32X
 Tempo

Game Gear
Tempo Jr.

Sega Saturn
Galaxy Fraulein Yuna Remix
 Galaxy Fraulein Yuna 3
 Sakura Taisen
 Sakura Taisen 2 ~Kimi, Shinitamou koto Nakare~
 Sakura Taisen Teigeki Graph
 Super Tempo
 Tengai Makyou: Daiyon no Mokushiroku: The Apocalypse IV

Dreamcast
 Sakura Taisen 3 ~Pari wa Moeteiru ka~
 Sakura Taisen 4 ~Koi Seyo, Otome~

With PQube

PlayStation 4, Nintendo Switch, Steam
 Our World Is Ended.

PC
 Sakura Taisen Taishou Roman Gakuentan (Browser game)
 Tengai Makyou JIPANG7 (Browser game)

References

External links
Official website
Red Entertainment profile on MobyGames
Red Entertainment at IGN

 
Software companies based in Tokyo
Japanese companies established in 2000
Video game companies established in 2000
Video game companies of Japan
Video game development companies
Video game publishers